Gembrook is a town in Victoria, Australia,  south-east of Melbourne's Central Business District, located within the Shire of Cardinia local government area. Gembrook recorded a population of 2,559 at the 2021 census.

Gembrook is a popular destination for the residents of Melbourne as it is less than 1.5 hours drive from the city centre.

History

Gembrook was settled in 1873 for farming and timber; the surrounding countryside was suitable for both dairy and orchards. Timber provided income while farms were established. The name Gembrook came from the small gems that were found in small creeks and watercourses in the surrounding area.

The Post Office opened on 5 October 1877.

Puffing Billy railway

The Gembrook railway line was opened from Upper Ferntree Gully on 18 December 1900. The narrow gauge line, these days known as Puffing Billy, brought tourists from Melbourne, as well as enabling timber and local produce, including fruit trees and potatoes, to be taken back to Melbourne. More than 20 timber mills were operating in the Gembrook area, with timber from the mills transported to the station on narrow gauge timber tramways.  After the devastating fires in 1926 and 1939 which destroyed many of the timber mills, there was talk of closing the line. The line eventually closed on 30 April 1954 after a landslide blocked part of the line the previous year (the line was already in decline because motor traffic had replaced much of the railway's patronage). Soon after this time (between 1958 and 1962) the broad gauge line to Upper Ferntree Gully was extended to Belgrave which is less than 18 km away from Gembrook. In 1962, the western end of the Gembrook railway line which extended from Belgrave to Menzies Creek was reopened as a heritage tourist railway. Later extensions to Emerald in 1965, and Lakeside (in Emerald Lake Park) in 1975, were opened and finally the last section to Gembrook in 1998, which saw the complete service resume between Belgrave and Gembrook. A short section from Gembrook towards Cockatoo was gradually reopened in the early 1990s as restoration work progressed.

Tourism
Tourism in the region developed as a direct result of the railway opening the area up. The Ranges Hotel originally constructed in 1894, was expanded in 1901 to cater for day trippers and excursionists from Melbourne as well as the local population.
The Ranges Hotel reopened in 2017 after an extended renovation, including the sale of the hotel. On 24 September 2018 the hotel was destroyed in a fire; the site was cleared and eventually sold, and awaits redevelopment. The historic Kurth Kiln is about 7 km north of the town.

Modern Gembrook

Today Gembrook is seen by some as a suburb of Melbourne as it is within the Melbourne metropolitan area. Gembrook no longer relies on the income generated from farming and timber but rather from tourism and other professional services. The current population of Gembrook is over 2,000.  The town is located within the Shire of Cardinia, and is within the state electoral area of Gembrook, and the federal electorate area of La Trobe.

Gembrook is served by a regular daily bus service running from/to Belgrave (route 695). A Friday evening and Saturday/Sunday service also runs from/to Fountain Gate shopping centre at Narre Warren (route 695F). A daily (excluding Sundays) service runs from/to Pakenham (route 840).

Together with its neighbouring township Cockatoo, Gembrook has an Australian Rules football team (Gembrook Cockatoo) competing in the Yarra Valley Mountain District Football League.

Gembrook is known as a major winemaking region, containing several well-known wineries.

The town is also home to the Gillwell Park Scout Camp one of the largest scout camps in the southern hemisphere.

Gembrook is served by a volunteer CFA fire brigade, with the station located on Innes Road.

See also
 Shire of Pakenham — Gembrook was previously within this former local government area.
 Puffing Billy Railway
 Electoral district of Gembrook
Kurth Kiln

References

External links
 Gembrook Village website Information on the Gembrook area
 Eastern Dandenong Ranges
 Local History of Gembrook
  Gembrook Rural Fire Brigade website  Information about the township's fire brigade

Towns in Victoria (Australia)
Shire of Cardinia